This list of board game awards is an index to articles that describe notable awards given to creators of board games. It also gives articles related to chess and go competitions.

Game awards

Players

Chess

 Grandmaster (chess) Awarded by Switzerland-based FIDE. The highest title a chess player can attain 
 Geography of chess – National federations and championships recognized by FIDE
 World Chess Championship
 World Junior Chess Championship

Go

 List of professional Go tournaments
 List of top title holders in Go

See also

 Lists of awards
 List of game awards
 List of Game of the Year awards (board games)

References

 
Board games